Kishori Mohan Bandyopadhyay (1883–1929) was an Indian social activist and writer.

Early life and education
Bandyopadhyay was born in the Bowbazer area of Kolkata at his maternal grandparents' home. In 1901 he passed the entrance examination for the Ripon Collegiate School. In 1903 he passed the F A examination from Ripon College as well as the Addya examination in Sanskrit. He did not pass his BA exam. He later taught at B M S Girls School in Kolkata and thereafter at Trannath High School of Panihati where he worked till 1914. In 1914 he re-did his BA as a private candidate and passed.  Two years later he passed the Bachelor of Laws at the University of Calcutta.

Social services
Bandyopadhyay was a noted social worker of that time. He under the influence of the revolutionary Mokhyada Charan Samadhyayi who started gymnasium in the village of Panihati. In 1908 he married Anadinath Chatterjee of Panihati's sister. He lived in the house of Anadinath in Panihati, the opposite side of Nilambati, Panihat which was later demolished and rebuilt into apartments. The gymnasium started by Kishori Mohan became the Panihati Club in 1914 and it is still now active as a social organisation. In 1918 Dr. Gopal Chandra Chattopadhyay started a public health movement to control the malaria epidemic. Kishori Mohan became his ardent co-worker.

Anti Malaria Cooperative Society 
In 1918, a meeting of the villagers took place at Trannath High School. There, Dr. Gopal Chandra Chattopadhyay established that the spread malaria could be controlled through sanitary conscience of the common people. The Anti Malaria Cooperative Society was formed in India at Panihati on 24 March 1918 with 27 people. Chattopadhyay was the organization's first president and Bandopahyay its first Secretary. Within three months by cleaning ponds, drains of the village, removing garbage and spraying Kerosene oil, malaria was under control. This success story encouraged the villagers of the neighborhood and Anti Malaria Cooperative Societies were formed. That movement resulted in the formation of the Central Anti Malaria Cooperative Society in a meeting held on 8 April 1919 at Rammohan Library Hall in Calcutta. The Central Society was presided over by Dr. Kailash Chandra Bose with Chattopadhyay as Secretary.

Kishorimohan continued as the Secretary of the Panihati Society till 1923. He became busy in propagating the message of sanitary conscience throughout undivided Bengal with the help of Magic Lantern. The Central Society started its own bi-lingual monthly journal 'Sonar Bangla' under the Editorship of Bipin Chandra Pal and Chattopadhyay. Kishori Mohan was a regular contributor of this journal.

In 1928 Dr. Gopal Chandra Chatterjee started the movement of home crofting. Kishori Mohan contributed a lot to make this movement also a successful one. Kishori Mohan Bandyopadhyay also co-founded The Panihati Cooperative Bank in 1927. He was elected by the villagers in the Panihati Municipality as Commissioner twice.

Awards and honors  
Bandyopadhyay received a Gold Medal for his contribution in anti-malaria efforts at the annual conference of the Central anti Malaria Cooperative Society for his contributions in the movement. Panihati municipality has a street named Kishori Mohan Banerjee Road.

Death
Bandyopadhyay's health took a turn for the worse due to his long hours of working. He contracted pneumonia and later meningitis. At the age of 46 he died in his Panihati residence on 20 August 1929. He had wife and 6 children. A condolence meeting in his memory was held on 1 September 1929 at Trannath High School.

References

External links 
Gold Medal awarded to Kishori Mohan Bandyopadhyay
Kishori Mohan Bandyopadhyay's role
Saswata Shikidar. Chhan pp. 33–39.  Horina Horinir. Quark Publishers, Kolkata 700 034. July 2004. 
Malay Roy Choudhury. Chhotoloker Chhotobelapp. 106–07. Charchapad Publishers, Kolkata 700 012. January 2010.
Krishanu Bhattacharya. Panihati Parikrama pp. 21. Panihati. 1995.

1883 births
1929 deaths
Scientists from Kolkata
Bengali scientists
20th-century Bengalis
19th-century Bengalis
Bengali Hindus
University of Calcutta alumni
Social workers
Indian educators
19th-century Indian educators
20th-century Indian educators
Educationists from India
Indian educational theorists
19th-century Indian educational theorists
20th-century Indian educational theorists
Social workers from West Bengal
Indian social workers
Scientists from British India
20th-century Indian scientists
Writers in British India